Bokelmann is a surname and may refer to:

Christian Ludwig Bokelmann (1844–1894), German genre painter in the Realistic and Naturalistic styles
Dick Bokelmann (1926–2019), American Major League Baseball pitcher 
Hertha Bokelmann (née Faekle) (1915-2005), Spanish-born South African botanist and botanical illustrator